Anastasia is a super-yacht built in May 2008 at the shipyard Oceanco. Its exterior and interior were designed by Sam Sorgiovanni.

In 2018, the yacht was sold for €67.5 million and renamed Wheels.

History 
The Anastasia was built at the Oceanco shipyard in May 2008 for Vladimir Potanin. 

The ship was listed for sale in July 2012 for €125 million.

The yacht was sold for €67.5 million and renamed Wheels in 2018.

Design 
Its hull is steel, and the superstructure is aluminium with teak laid decks. The classification of the yacht, according to Lloyds Register is 100AI SSC Yacht (P) MONO G6 LMC UMS MCA Certification, issued by Cayman Islands.

Features 
The ship has seven decks, a duplex master suite, and a cinema and main saloon. It also has a jacuzzi, split-level sundeck and a garage that houses tenders, jet skis and dive equipment. It can accommodate 12 guests and 20 crew members.

Engines 
The main engines are two MTU 4000 Series V16 with power of 2720 KW (3648 hp) at 2100rpm.

Gallery

See also 
 Pelorus
 Alysia
Azimut
 Benetti
 List of yachts built by Oceanco

References

External links

Anastasia official website
Track Anastasia in real time

2008 ships
Motor yachts
Vladimir Potanin